Wilhelm Menne (11 August 1910 – 27 March 1945), also known as Willi Menne, was a German rower who competed in the 1936 Summer Olympics where he won the gold medal as a member of the German crew in the coxless four competition. He was killed in Trenčín, Slovakia, while serving during WWII.

References

External links
 profile

1910 births
1945 deaths
Olympic rowers of Germany
Rowers at the 1936 Summer Olympics
Olympic gold medalists for Germany
Olympic medalists in rowing
German male rowers
Medalists at the 1936 Summer Olympics
Sportspeople from Würzburg
German military personnel killed in World War II
European Rowing Championships medalists